Andrian Cucovei (born 21 April 1982) is a former Moldovan footballer who played as defender.

Honours 
 Moldovan Cup: 2003-04, 2004–05
 Moldovan Supercup Runner-up: 2004, 2005
 Moldovan National Division Runner-up: 2003-04, 2006-07 (with Zimbru), 2007-08 (with Dacia)

External links 
 
 
 Андриан Куковей: Последний из настоящих «зубров». Интервью на сайте moldfootball.com 

1982 births
Living people
Moldova international footballers
Moldovan footballers
FC Dacia Chișinău players
FC Dunărea Călărași players
FC Zimbru Chișinău players
FC Iskra-Stal players
FC Milsami Orhei players
Expatriate footballers in Romania
Expatriate footballers in Russia
Moldovan expatriate footballers
Association football defenders
FC Spartak-MZhK Ryazan players